Ibrahim Al-Matrooshi (born 1 July 1970) is an Emirati athlete. He competed in the men's decathlon at the 1992 Summer Olympics.

References

1970 births
Living people
Athletes (track and field) at the 1992 Summer Olympics
Emirati decathletes
Olympic athletes of the United Arab Emirates
Place of birth missing (living people)